The ICC Termination Act of 1995 is a United States federal law enacted in 1995 that abolished the Interstate Commerce Commission and simultaneously created its successor agency, the Surface Transportation Board.

On December 1, 2020, Oklahoma City federal judge Charles B. Goodwin referred to this Act when he declared unconstitutional a 2019 State of Oklahoma law preventing trains from blocking streets for longer than 10 minutes; declaring, in part:

References

External links
 ICC Termination Act of 1995 (PDF/details) as amended in the GPO Statute Compilations collection
Determination Under the Interstate Commerce Commission Termination Act of 1995 - President's Memorandum to the Secretary of Transportation, 2002-11-27

Acts of the 104th United States Congress
1995 in rail transport
Termination Act
United States federal transportation legislation
United States railroad regulation